Crystal Bayat (کریستال بیات) is an Afghan social activist and human rights advocate known for her protests against the Taliban takeover, advocacy for women rights and political activism inside and outside Afghanistan. A native of the Ghazni province, Shia (coming from the Bayat family, a Turkic ethnicity minority. Bayat was born in 1997 in Kabul. She grew up most of her life with democracy and positive societal changes. She is currently continuing the fight to preserve Afghan human right's achievements as an agent of change.

Early life 
Bayat was born in 1997 in Kabul and is a native of Ghazni province, and a member of the Bayat tribe, a Turkic ethnic minority. Her mother is a gynaecologist (currently unable to work due to Taliban takeover) and her father worked for the Ministry of Interior Affairs before the collapse of the republic.

Social activist contributions 
After returning from school in India to Afghanistan in 2020, Bayat started the civil rights political think tank, Justice and Equality Trend, and the Crystal Bayat Foundation, a human rights charity foundation focused on helping Afghan people at risk.

She helped lead Kabul’s Independence Day protests just days after the Taliban took-over the city in mid August 2021. One of the seven women at a protest of roughly 200 people, she led the pack, shouting, "Our flag is our identity!" Bayat remains firm in her opinion that the Taliban still does "not believe in the freedom and demands of Afghan citizens especially women, and that no one has made a honest effort to hold them accountable." Bayat is currently active in protesting against the Taliban and warns that they "have not changed."

In line with her socio-political activism, Bayat launched the campaign for the ethnic minority “Bayat is Our Identity and Our Identity is Our Pride.” After writing a letter to former Afghan President Mohammad Ashraf Ghani, she succeeded in inserting the minority ethnic name into the national ID cards which was a major country-wide achievement for Crystal Bayat. She was also the representative of minorities at peace negotiations in Doha between the Taliban and the former government. She was the member of Loy Jerga, the traditional grand assembly of Afghanistan. Bayat survived an assassination attempt by the Taliban in 2020 due to her active role in peace negotiations. She has published several articles in national and international media (in Persian and English) on women's rights during the peace talks with the Taliban. In 2020, Bayat also co-launched a campaign with friend Fariha called #MenstrationIsNotTaboo before she was forced to leave Afghanistan.  

Bayat continues to speak to the media and at public and private events about the current geopolitical situation in Afghanistan. She is also active in helping friends, family and academic and professional colleagues achieve a collective voice against today's inhumane treatment and poor governance by the Taliban.

She writes on the plight of Afghan women and education and about Afghan minority challenges for national and international newspapers. Bayat edited a news and current affairs column in the telematic periodical Aleph & other Tales entitled, "The girl with the Afghan flag.".

Education 
After high school graduation, Bayat received a fifth ranking on the Kankor examination out of three hundred thousand students across Afghanistan.

After acceptance to the Kabul University, Faculty of Law, Bayat was awarded a scholarship from Indian Council for Cultural Relations. She went to join Daulat Ram College in Delhi, and graduated with a bachelor's degree in political science in 2019 in the first ranking. She holds a master's degree from the United Nations Institute in Delhi. In 2021, Bayat started her PhD at Delhi University in Political Management but her program was cut short due to the Taliban takeover.

Bayat has been accepted into the Carnegie Mellon University, Pittsburg, USA, Heinz College Masters of Public Policy program. She plans to start the MPP as a full-time student in the fall of 2023.

Awards and recognitions 
In 2020, Bayat received the Rumi Award (2nd place) in the "Literature Category" and was also named as one of 50 Influential Women by Rumi Award organizers. She was also recognized by the former Afghan president and parliament in early 2020 for activism in passing the minority rights bill.

On December 7, 2021, Crystal Bayat was named in the BBC 100 Women 2021 list for her social activist and human-rights advocacy, which figured prominently in protests against the Taliban takeover in 2021.

References

External links

People from the Bayat tribe
Living people
Afghan human rights activists
Afghan women activists
Delhi University alumni
People from Kabul
1997 births
BBC 100 Women